Bamanhat High School is co-educational high school in the heart of Bamanhat, India.

Overview 
The school is a higher secondary in the Dinhata subdivision of Coochbehar, West Bengal. It caters to the village students its surrounding villages. It is the only high school among those few villages.

Courses 
It has students from Class V to Class XII. The XII (Higher Secondary) is taught on Arts courses.

Admission 
The admission is taken in Class V, Class VI, Class IX and Class XI.

References
 http://www.schoolsworld.in/schools/showschool.php?school_id=19030207201

High schools and secondary schools in West Bengal
Schools in Cooch Behar district
Educational institutions in India with year of establishment missing